Graham station  may refer to:

Train stations
Graham railway station,  a light rail station in Port Melbourne, Victoria, Australia
Graham station (New York Central Railroad), a former commuter rail station in Mount Pleasant, New York, United States
Graham Avenue station, a subway station in Brooklyn, New York, United States

Places
Graham Station, West Virginia

See also
Graham Central Station
Graham Central Station (album)